Marathon Middle High School is a public middle school and high school in Marathon, Florida in the Florida Keys. It is within the Monroe County School District.

Notable alumni 

 Tony Bryant – American football player

References

External links
 
 
 Dolphin Pride (school newspaper)

Public high schools in Florida
Education in Monroe County, Florida
Public middle schools in Florida
Educational institutions established in 1957
1957 establishments in Florida